The 1972–73 Honduran Segunda División was scheduled to be the seventh season of the Honduran Segunda División.  However, the season was cancelled due to a national football strike.  No team was promoted to the 1973–74 Honduran Liga Nacional

References

Segunda
1972